The 1898 Miami Redskins football team was an American football team that represented Miami University during the 1898 college football season.

Schedule

References

Miami
Miami RedHawks football seasons
Miami Redskins football